Depressaria corticinella is a moth of the family Depressariidae. It is found in France, Spain, Hungary, Romania and Turkey.

References

External links
lepiforum.de

Moths described in 1854
Depressaria
Moths of Europe
Moths of Asia